"Vocalise" is a song by Sergei Rachmaninoff, composed and published in 1915 as the last of his 14 Songs or 14 Romances, Op. 34. Written for high voice (soprano or tenor) with piano accompaniment, it contains no words, but is sung using only one vowel of the singer's choosing (see also vocalise). It was dedicated to soprano singer Antonina Nezhdanova. It is performed in various instrumental arrangements far more frequently than the original vocal version.

Range
Although the original publication stipulates that the song may be sung by either soprano or tenor voice, it is usually performed by a soprano. Though the original composition is in the key signature of C-sharp minor, it is sometimes transposed into a variety of keys, allowing performers to choose a vocal range more suitable to their natural voice, so that artists who may not have the higher vocal range of a soprano can perform the song.

Arrangements

"Vocalise" has been arranged for many instrumental and vocal combinations. Examples are:

For/with orchestra
 for orchestra, arranged by Rachmaninoff himself, also by Morton Gould, Kurt Sanderling
 for soprano and orchestra, also by Rachmaninoff himself
also by Zoltán Kocsis
 for choir and orchestra, arranged by Norman Luboff
 for flute and orchestra, arranged by Charles Gerhardt

For chamber ensemble
 for piano trio (violin, cello and piano), arranged by the Eroica Trio
 for piano trio (soprano, oboe and piano), arranged by Andrew Bayles
 for jazz ensemble, arranged by Don Sebesky

For solo instrument and piano
 for alto flute and piano, arranged by James Guthrie
 for clarinet and piano, arranged by Stanley Drucker
 for trumpet and piano, arranged by Romain Leleu
 for trombone and piano, arranged by Christian Lindberg
 for euphonium and piano, arranged by Steven Mead
 for violin and piano, arranged by Jascha Heifetz
 for violin and piano, arranged by Karl Gutheil
 for viola and piano, arranged by Leonard Davis, english viola player
 for viola and piano, arranged by Paul Silverthorne
 for cello and piano, arranged by Anatoliy Brandukov
 for cello and piano, arranged by Jascha Heifetz and Mstislav Rostropovich
 for cello and piano, arranged by Raphael Wallfisch
 for double bass and piano, arranged by Stuart Sankey
 for double bass and piano, arranged by Oscar G. Zimmerman (in D minor)
 for saxophone and piano, arranged by John Harle
 for horn and piano, transcribed by Himie Voxman
 for bassoon and piano, arranged by Leonard Sharrow (in C minor)
 for theremin and piano, arranged by Clara Rockmore
 for flute and piano, arranged by Robert Stallman
 for oboe and piano, arranged by Humbert Lucarelli

For solo instrument
 for solo piano, many arrangements, including by Alexander Siloti, Alan Richardson (1951), Zoltán Kocsis, Earl Wild, Sergio Fiorentino
 for organ, arranged by Cameron Carpenter
 for double bass, arranged by Gary Karr
 for guitar, arranged by Slash
 for saxophone, arranged by Larry Teal
 for theremin, arranged by Thorwald Jørgensen
 for trumpet, arranged by Rolf Smedvig

Other
 for two pianos, arranged by Vitya Vronsky
 for electronic instruments, arranged by Isao Tomita
 for cello with voice, arranged by Bobby McFerrin and Yo-Yo Ma

Derivative works
Gospel legend Richard Smallwood, himself a classically-trained pianist, used the main theme of "Vocalise" as the basis for his composition "The Resurrection", the final cut on The Richard Smallwood Singers' debut recording in 1982.  The Pet Shop Boys song "Happiness Is an Option" on their 1999 album Nightlife incorporates a large portion of the "Vocalise" melody in each verse, performed on oboe as background material beneath the spoken text.

References

External links
Review of a CD consisting entirely of different arrangements of Rachmaninoff's Vocalise

Performance of Vocalise by pianist Gleb Ivanov from the Isabella Stewart Gardner Museum in MP3 format

Compositions by Sergei Rachmaninoff
1915 compositions
Art songs
Instrumentals
Compositions in C-sharp minor